Poecilochaetus is a genus of marine worms within the Polychaeta. It is the only genus in the monotypic family Poecilochaetidae. Members of this genus are benthic worms that burrow into soft sediments.

Species
The World Register of Marine Species lists the following species:-

Poecilochaetus australis Nonato, 1963
Poecilochaetus bermudensis Hartman, 1965
Poecilochaetus bifurcatus Imajima, 1989
Poecilochaetus clavatus Imajima, 1989
Poecilochaetus elongatus Imajima, 1989
Poecilochaetus exmouthensis Hartmann-Schröder, 1980
Poecilochaetus fauchaldi Pilato & Cantone, 1976
Poecilochaetus fulgoris Claparède in Ehlers, 1875
Poecilochaetus gallardoi Pilato & Cantone, 1976
Poecilochaetus granulatus Imajima, 1989
Poecilochaetus hystricosus Mackie, 1990
Poecilochaetus ishikariensis Imajima, 1989
Poecilochaetus japonicus Kitamori, 1965
Poecilochaetus johnsoni Hartman, 1939
Poecilochaetus koshikiensis Miura, 1988
Poecilochaetus magnus Imajima, 1989
Poecilochaetus martini Brantley, 2009
Poecilochaetus modestus Rullier, 1965
Poecilochaetus multibranchiatus Leon-Gonzalez, 1992
Poecilochaetus paratropicus Gallardo, 1968
Poecilochaetus perequensis Santos & Mackie, 2008
Poecilochaetus polycirratus Santos & Mackie, 2008
Poecilochaetus serpens Allen, 1904
Poecilochaetus spinulosus Mackie, 1990
Poecilochaetus tokyoensis Imajima, 1989
Poecilochaetus trachyderma Read, 1986
Poecilochaetus tricirratus Mackie, 1990
Poecilochaetus trilobatus Imajima, 1989
Poecilochaetus tropicus Okuda, 1937
Poecilochaetus vietnamita Gallardo, 1968
Poecilochaetus vitjazi Levenstein, 1962

References

Annelid genera
Canalipalpata